Billy Quarantillo (born December 8, 1988) is an American mixed martial artist who currently competes in the Featherweight division of the Ultimate Fighting Championship. He was the former King of the Cage Lightweight Champion.

Mixed martial arts career

Early career
Born in Ransomville, New York and trained by way of his adopted hometown of Tampa, Quarantillo began his fighting tenure on the amateur circuit in July 2010. After the Gracie Tampa South representative posted an 8–2 mark through ten outings, he turned pro in 2013.

Quarantillo competed for various regional American organizations, in the process amassing a record of 11–2 and winning the King of the Cage Lightweight Championship and Strike Off Fighting Championships Featherweight Championship.

The Ultimate Fighter
Quarantillo also competed on The Ultimate Fighter: Team McGregor vs. Team Faber in 2015. In the preliminary fights, he defeated Brandon Ricetti via TKO in the second round to become a member of Team Faber. In his second bout, he lost to Saul Rogers via unanimous decision after two rounds.

Dana White's Contender Series
After earning 5 more wins and 1 loss on the regional circuit, Quarantillo eventually gained a second chance for a UFC contract on Dana White's Contender Series 21 on July 23, 2019. He successfully acquired a contract by defeating Kamuela Kirk via TKO in the third round.

Ultimate Fighting Championship
Quarantillo made his UFC debut against short notice opponent Jacob Kilburn at UFC on ESPN: Overeem vs. Rozenstruik on December 7, 2019. He won the fight with a second round submission via triangle choke.

Quarantillo next faced Spike Carlyle at UFC on ESPN: Woodley vs. Burns on May 30, 2020 in a catchweight bout. He won the bout via a unanimous decision.

In his third bout for the promotion, Quarantillo faced Kyle Nelson on September 12, 2020 at UFC Fight Night: Waterson vs. Hill. He won the fight via knockout in round three.

Quarantillo faced Gavin Tucker on December 12, 2020 at UFC 256. He lost the fight via unanimous decision.

Quarantillo was scheduled to face Herbert Burns on July 17, 2021 at UFC on ESPN 26. However, Burns pulled out in early June due to undisclosed reasons and was replaced by Gabriel Benítez. Quarantillo knocked Benítez down early and eventually won the bout via technical knockout in round three. This win earned him the Fight of the Night award.

Quarantillo fought Shane Burgos on November 6, 2021 at UFC 268. He lost the fight by unanimous decision.

Quarantillo was scheduled to face Bill Algeo on July 16, 2022 at UFC on ABC 3. However, he pulled out due to injury.

Quarantillo faced Alexander Hernandez on December 10, 2022 at UFC 282. He won the fight via technical knockout in round two. This win earned him the Performance of the Night award.

Quarantillo is scheduled to face Edson Barboza  on April 15, 2023 at UFC on ESPN 44.

Championships and accomplishments
 Ultimate Fighting Championship
Fight of the Night (One time) 
Performance of the Night (One time) 
Strike Off Fighting Championships
 Strike Off Fighting Championships Featherweight Champion (One time)
King of the Cage
 King of the Cage Lightweight Champion (One time)

Mixed martial arts record

|- 
|Win
|align=center|17–4
|Alexander Hernandez
|TKO (knees and punches)
|UFC 282
|
|align=center|2
|align=center|4:30
|Las Vegas, Nevada, United States
|
|-
|Loss
|align=center|16–4
|Shane Burgos
|Decision (unanimous)
|UFC 268
|
|align=center|3
|align=center|5:00
|New York City, New York, United States
|
|-
|Win
|align=center|16–3
|Gabriel Benítez
|TKO (punches)
|UFC on ESPN: Makhachev vs. Moisés
|
|align=center|3
|align=center|3:40
|Las Vegas, Nevada, United States
|
|-
|Loss
|align=center|15–3
|Gavin Tucker
|Decision (unanimous)
|UFC 256
|
|align=center|3
|align=center|5:00
|Las Vegas, Nevada, United States
|
|-
|Win
|align=center| 15–2
|Kyle Nelson
|KO (punch)
|UFC Fight Night: Waterson vs. Hill
|
|align=center|3
|align=center|0:07
|Las Vegas, Nevada, United States
| 
|-
| Win
| align=center| 14–2
| Spike Carlyle
| Decision (unanimous)
|UFC on ESPN: Woodley vs. Burns
|
|align=center|3
|align=center|5:00
|Las Vegas, Nevada, United States
|
|-
| Win
| align=center| 13–2
| Jacob Kilburn
| Submission (triangle choke)
|UFC on ESPN: Overeem vs. Rozenstruik 
|
|align=center|2
|align=center|3:18
|Washington, D.C., United States
|
|-
| Win
| align=center| 12–2
| Kamuela Kirk
| TKO (punches)
| Dana White's Contender Series 21
| 
| align=center| 3
| align=center| 0:22
| Las Vegas, Nevada, United States
| 
|-
| Win
| align=center| 11–2
| Adrian Vilaca
| TKO (punches)
| KOTC: Combat Zone
| 
| align=center| 2
| align=center| 4:32
| Niagara Falls, New York, United States
|
|-
| Win
| align=center| 10–2
| Eric Reynolds
| TKO (punches)
| V3 Fights 61
| 
| align=center| 1
| align=center| 1:00
| Tampa, Florida, United States
|
|-
| Win
| align=center|9–2
| Ryan Fillingame
| TKO (retirement)
| KOTC: Raw Deal
| 
| align=center|2
| align=center|5:00
| Niagara Falls, New York, United States
|
|-
| Win
| align=center|8–2
| Matthew DiMarcantonio
| Decision (unanimous)
| KOTC: National Dispute
| 
| align=center|3
| align=center|5:00
| Niagara Falls, New York, United States
|
|-
| Loss
| align=center|7–2
| Michel Quiñones
| TKO (punches)
| Absolute FC 25
| 
| align=center|1
| align=center|2:51
| Coconut Creek, Florida, United States
|
|-
| Win
| align=center|7–1
| Marc Stevens
| Decision (unanimous)
| Absolute FC 24
| 
| align=center|3
| align=center|5:00
| Coconut Creek, Florida, United States
|
|-
| Win
| align=center| 6–1
| Khama Worthy
| TKO
| Strike Off 4
| 
| align=center|2
| align=center|0:10
| Annandale, Virginia, United States
|
|-
| Win
| align=center| 5–1
| Terrell Hobbs
| Submission (triangle choke)
| Strike Off 2
|
|align=Center|3
|align=center|2:13
|Woodbridge, Virginia, United States
| 
|-
| Win
| align=center| 4–1
| Isaac Figueroa
| Submission (rear-naked choke)
| Real FC 31
| 
| align=center| 2
| align=center| 3:34
| Tampa, Florida, United States
| 
|-
| Win
| align=center| 3–1
| Sandro da Silva
| Submission (armbar)
| Strike Off 1
| 
| align=center| 1
| align=center| 0:49
| Woodbridge, Virginia, United States
| 
|-
| Loss
| align=center| 2–1
|J. P. Reese
| Decision (unanimous)
| Real FC 29
| 
| align=center| 3
| align=center| 5:00
| Tampa, Florida, United States
| 
|-
| Win
| align=center| 2–0
| Howard Reece
| Submission (armbar)
| Real FC 28
| 
| align=center| 1
| align=center| 1:45
| Tampa, Florida, United States
|
|-
| Win
| align=center| 1–0
| John de Jesus
| Decision (split)
| Fight Time 13: MMA Kings
| 
| align=center| 3
| align=center| 5:00
| Fort Lauderdale, Florida, United States
|

|-
| Loss
| align=center | 1–1
| Saul Rogers
| Decision (unanimous)
| rowspan=2|The Ultimate Fighter: Team McGregor vs. Team Faber
|  (air date)
| align=center | 2
| align=center | 5:00
| rowspan=2|Las Vegas, Nevada, United States
| 
|-
| Win
| align=center | 1–0
| Brandon Ricetti
| TKO (punches)
|  (air date)
| align=center | 2
| align=center | 2:53
|

Professional boxing record

See also 
 List of current UFC fighters
 List of male mixed martial artists

References

External links 
  
 

1988 births
Living people
American male mixed martial artists
Lightweight mixed martial artists
Mixed martial artists utilizing boxing
Mixed martial artists utilizing Brazilian jiu-jitsu
Ultimate Fighting Championship male fighters
American male boxers
American practitioners of Brazilian jiu-jitsu
People awarded a black belt in Brazilian jiu-jitsu